Erwin Hermann Lambert (7 December 1909 – 15 October 1976) was a perpetrator of the Holocaust.  In profession, he was a master mason, building trades foreman, Nazi Party member and member of the Schutzstaffel with the rank of SS-Unterscharführer (corporal).  He supervised construction of the gas chambers for the Action T4 euthanasia program at Hartheim, Sonnenstein, Bernburg and Hadamar, and then at Sobibór and Treblinka extermination camps during Operation Reinhard.  He specialized in building larger gas chambers that killed more people than previous efforts in the extermination program.

Biography
Lambert was born on 7 December 1909 in Schildow, a small town in Mühlenbecker Land, in the Niederbarnim district.  His father was killed in the First World War; his stepfather owned a construction firm in Schildow.  After basic schooling, Lambert became an apprentice, first to a locksmith, and then to a mason.  After passing his apprentice exam, he attended a school for the building trades in Berlin in the mid-1920s and passed his examination for master mason in the mid-1930s.  He was always employed as a mason and, after becoming a master mason, as a foreman for various Berlin construction firms.

Lambert joined the Nazi Party in March 1933, after Hitler's assumption of national power, and first worked within the Party as a Blockleiter in Schildow.  Lambert was not yet a member of any of the party's paramilitary organizations.

Late in 1939, the Action T4 program tried to recruit Lambert, who had been recommended by the local office of the German Labour Front. He accepted the offer in January 1940.  Lambert was hired to serve as a construction foreman who supervised the other workers; he was "the traveling construction boss of Action T4".

Construction of gas chambers

Lambert's primary task was to direct construction work at the T4 killing centres, particularly the construction of gas chambers and crematoria.  In testimony Lambert claimed that he merely erected room dividers and installed doors, a claim largely discredited. Since Brandenburg and Grafeneck had already been completed before Lambert joined the T4 program, he worked at Hartheim, Sonnenstein, Bernburg, and Hadamar as the program's "expert for the construction of gas chambers".

After T4's termination, Lambert was posted to Operation Reinhard in Lublin reservation for the purpose of bricklaying assignments which constructed the gas chambers in Sobibór and Treblinka extermination camps. At Lublin Lambert joined the SS. During this time, however, his work was often interrupted for further construction jobs in Germany and Austria involving the still-ongoing Action 14f13. With the help of Ukrainian volunteers, and condemned Jewish prisoners, Lambert constructed solid gassing facilities at Sobibor and Treblinka: "Using his expert knowledge about gassing installations, Lambert was able rapidly to complete all work on the big gas house [in Treblinka]".

During his testimony at the Sobibór trial in Hagen, Germany (whose lead defendant was Kurt Bolender), lasting from 6 September 1965 until 20 December 1966, Lambert stated:

In addition, Lambert directed construction at several nearby forced labour camps such as Dohorucza and the Poniatowa concentration camp. Reportedly, Lambert attempted to remain an uninvolved expert devoted solely to his work and not interested in the conditions which surrounded it.  According to one survivor, Jankiel Wiernik, Lambert avoided looking at dead bodies and treated his Jewish workers in a professional manner.

At the conclusion of Operation Reinhard, Lambert was posted to Trieste, where he continued installing cremation facilities at the concentration camp Risiera di San Sabba.

After the war, Lambert was arrested on 28 March 1962. At the First Treblinka Trial in 1965, Lambert was tried for the first time and sentenced to four years' imprisonment for aiding and abetting the murder of at least 300,000 people.  Having already served this time, he was allowed to live as a free man. At the Sobibór Trial in 1966, Lambert was acquitted. At the trials Lambert denied involvement in the killing operation and claimed that he merely suspected that the buildings would be used for killing. Lambert died on 15 October 1976.

References

External links

1909 births
1976 deaths
People from Oberhavel
Aktion T4 personnel
Bricklayers
Operation Reinhard
People convicted in the Treblinka trials
Sobibor trial
SS non-commissioned officers
Holocaust perpetrators in Poland
Stonemasons
German prisoners of war in World War II held by the United Kingdom
German prisoners of war in World War II held by the United States